Mingju (Manchu:, Mölendroff: mingju; , November 19, 1635 – June 3, 1708), of the Manchu Nara clan, was an official of the Qing Dynasty during the reign of the Kangxi Emperor. He was thrown in prison for corruption.

Second cousin to the Shunzhi Emperor, Mingzhu came from an aristocratic line that belonged to the Plain Yellow Banner of the Eight Banners. His grandfather, Gintaisi, was the last prince of the Yehe Nara clan.

In 1677, Mingju was named the Grand Secretary, one of the top-ranking positions, and became involved in a long power struggle with Songgotu throughout the middle years of Kangxi's reign. He was related to Consort Hui, one of the Kangxi Emperor's concubines who bore the emperor his first surviving son, Yinzhi. Consequently, he supported Yinzhi during the struggles for succession. 

He was sent to prison for corruption and various other charges in his final years.

He married Ajige's fifth daughter and had at least three sons. His oldest son, Nara Singde, grew up to be a famous poet.

References

Grand Secretaries of the Qing dynasty
Manchu politicians
Manchu Plain Yellow Bannermen
Qing dynasty politicians
1708 deaths
1635 births